Malith de Silva can refer to:

 Malith de Silva (cricketer, born 1992), Sri Lankan cricketer
 Malith de Silva (cricketer, born 1995), Sri Lankan cricketer